Mehmed Emîn Bozarslan (born 1935), is a Kurdish writer. He was born in Diyarbakır in south-eastern Turkey. He moved to Sweden as political asylum seeker in 1978, and he has been living in Uppsala Sweden since then. The most famous of his early works was Alfabê which was the first ABC-Book for Kurdish learning that was published in Turkey in 1968. The books were impounded immediately by a Turkish court. Emin was arrested and jailed under separatism charges. He was released after a while but jailed again in another occasion under military regime from spring 1971 to summer of 1974. He moved to Sweden as political asylum seeker in 1978, and he has been living in Uppsala, Sweden since then.

Works

Books  
Alfabê, Istanbul, 64 pp., 1968.    
Meselokên lawiran. - Borås : Invandrarförlaget, 1981.   
Meyro : çîrok. - Borås : Invandrarförl., 79 pp., 1981.    
Mîr zoro, Borås : Invandrarförl., 80 pp., 1981.    
Gurê bilûrvan, Borås : Invandrarförl., 71 pp., ,1982.    
Kêz Xatûn, Borås : Invandrarförl., 79 pp., ,1982.    
Serketina miskan, Uppsala : Studieförl., 85 pp., ,1984.    
Pepûk, Uppsala : Deng Publishers, 70 pp., ,1985.    
Melayê meshûr, Uppsala: Deng Publishers, 85 pp., ,1986.    
Serefa ristem keya : pirtûka kurteçîrokan, Uppsala : Deng Publishers, 123 pp.,,1992.    
Kemal Paşa weledê kê ye? : meselokên sîyasî, Uppsala : Deng Publishers, 89 pp., ,1993.    
Çirokên gelî. 1 : Gulî xatûn, Uppsala : Deng Publishers, 88 pp., 1997.    
Çirokên gelî. 2 : Kurê mîrê masîyan, Uppsala : Deng Publishers, 120 pp., 1998.

Edits  
Jîn : kovara Kurdî-Tirkî : 1918-1919,(Jîn: Kurdish/Turkish Journal), Changing from Arabic script to Latin script by M. Emîn Bozarslan, Uppsala: Deng Publishers, 5 volumes, 1985-1988.   
Kurdistan : rojnama Kurdî ya pêsîn : 1898-1902,(Kurdistan: The first Kurdish newspaper), Changing from Arabic script to Latin script by M. Emîn Bozarslan. - Uppsala : Deng Publishers, 2 volumes, 1991.    
Mem û Zîn of Ehmedê Xanî, Changing from Arabic script to Latin script by M. Emîn Bozarslan, Uppsala : Deng Publishers, 703 pp., ,1995.

Folklore  
Pêkenokên gelî. vol. 1 : Masîyên bejî, Uppsala : Deng Publishers, 64 pp., 1987.    
Pêkenokên gelî. vol. 2 : Ji dînan dîntir, Uppsala : Deng Publishers, 64 pp., 1988.    
Pêkenokên gelî. vol. 3 : Ilmê tûrik, Uppsala : Deng Publishers, 79 pp., 1989.    
Pêkenokên gelî. vol. 4 : Bûka Gulsûn, Uppsala : Deng Publishers, 85 pp., 1990.    
Pêkenokên gelî. vol. 5 : Mela Kulî, Uppsala : Deng Publishers, 93 pp., 1991.

Articles  
On the role of myth in Kurdish literature : presented at the International Writers' Reunion in Lahti, Finland, June 15-19, 1981. - Lahti : International Writers' Reunion.

References  
Bozarslan (from Kurdish Academy of Language KAL)   
The list of published works of Bozarslan (in Swedish)
Anna Albertano, Un appello per la cultura curda di Mehmed Emin Bozarslan*(in Italian)

1935 births
Living people
Kurdish-language writers
Turkish emigrants to Sweden